The WTA New Jersey is a defunct WTA Tour affiliated tennis tournament played from 1978 to 1989. It was held in Mahwah, New Jersey in the United States and played on outdoor hard courts.

Steffi Graf was the most successful player at the tournament, winning the singles competition three times and the doubles competition in 1989 partnering American Pam Shriver.

Past finals

Singles

Doubles

References 
 WTA Results Archive

 
New Jersey
Hard court tennis tournaments
Sports in New Jersey
Recurring sporting events established in 1978
Recurring sporting events disestablished in 1989
Mahwah, New Jersey
Defunct tennis tournaments in the United States
1978 establishments in New Jersey
1989 disestablishments in New Jersey